At the 1928 Winter Olympics, two cross-country skiing events were contested. The 50 km competition was held on Tuesday, 14 February 1928 while the 18 km event was held on Friday, 17 February 1928.

Medal summary

Medal table

Events

Hedlund's margin of victory is the largest in Olympic history (13 minutes, 27 seconds).

Participating nations 
Cross-country skiers from Austria, Canada, Hungary, and the United States only competed in the 18 km event.  Nineteen cross-country skiers competed in both events.

A total of 74 cross-country skiers from 15 nations competed at the St. Moritz Games:

References

External links
 International Olympic Committee results database

 
1928 Winter Olympics
1928 Winter Olympics events
Olympics
Cross-country skiing competitions in Switzerland